Nenad Jezdić (born 12 July 1972) is a Serbian actor. He appeared in more than fifty films since 1993.

Selected filmography

References

External links 

1972 births
Living people
People from Valjevo
Serbian male film actors
Zoran Radmilović Award winners